Dead Man's Chest Island may refer to:
Dead Chest Island, British Virgin Islands (also called Dead Man's Chest Island), in the British Virgin Islands
Isla de Caja de Muertos, Puerto Rico (also called Dead Man's Chest Island), in Puerto Rico
Pelegosto, a fictional island hosting a prominent part of the action of Pirates of the Caribbean: Dead Man's Chest